Arijanet Anan Muric (born 7 November 1998) is a professional footballer who plays as a goalkeeper for EFL Championship club Burnley. Born in Switzerland, he represents the Kosovo national team.

Club career

Early career and Manchester City

Muric is a product of various Swiss youth teams such as Young Fellows Juventus, Zürich and Grasshoppers. In 2015, he joined with youth team of Manchester City. On 27 July 2017, Muric signed a three-year contract extension with Manchester City.

Short-time loan at NAC Breda and return from loan
On 31 July 2018, Muric joined Eredivisie side NAC Breda, on a season-long loan. On 18 August 2018, he made his debut as a professional footballer in a 3–0 home win against De Graafschap after being named in the starting line-up.

Four days after debut with NAC Breda, Manchester City recalled him from loan to replace injured goalkeeper Claudio Bravo as their second choice. Three days later, he was named as a Manchester City substitute for the first time in a Premier League match against Wolverhampton Wanderers. His debut with Manchester City came on 25 September in the 2018–19 EFL Cup third round against Oxford United after being named in the starting line-up.

Loan at Nottingham Forest
On 9 July 2019, Muric joined EFL Championship side Nottingham Forest, on a season-long loan. On 3 August 2019, he made his debut in a 1–2 home defeat against West Bromwich Albion after being named in the starting line-up. Muric's loan move was unsuccessful, with him serving as second choice goalkeeper behind Brice Samba, and failing to connect with the rest of the Forest squad.

Loan at Girona
On 18 September 2020, Muric joined Segunda División side Girona, on a season-long loan. Eight days later, he made his debut in a 2–0 away defeat against Sporting de Gijón after being named in the starting line-up.

Loan at Willem II
On 1 February 2021, Muric was loaned to Eredivisie side Willem II until the end of the season, to replace the injured Robbin Ruiter as the first choice. Thirteen days later, he made his debut in a 5–0 away defeat against Feyenoord after being named in the starting line-up.

Loan at Adana Demirspor
On 5 August 2021, Muric joined Süper Lig side Adana Demirspor, on a season-long loan. Ten days later, he made his debut in a 0–1 home defeat against Fenerbahçe after being named in the starting line-up.

Burnley
On 22 July 2022, Muric joined Championship side Burnley after agreeing to a four-year deal for an undisclosed fee. Seven days later, he made his debut in a 0–1 away win against Huddersfield Town after being named in the starting line-up.

International career

Montenegro

Under-21
On 22 August 2017, Muric received a call-up from Montenegro U21 for the 2019 UEFA European Under-21 Championship qualification match against Kazakhstan U21 and for the friendly match against Bosnia and Herzegovina U21. Fourteen days later, he made his debut with Montenegro U21 in a friendly match against Bosnia and Herzegovina U21 after being named in the starting line-up. In both matches, he played for Montenegro U21 and he was sent off after receiving straight red cards, one for handling the ball outside the box against Bosnia and Herzegovina U21 and the other for headbutting an opponent against Slovenia U21. Despite previously declaring his will to play for Montenegro after not being called up for the senior team, he opted to represent Kosovo instead.

Kosovo
On 26 August 2018, the Football Federation of Kosovo announced that after several months of talks, Muric had decided to play for the Kosovo national team. On 9 November 2018, he received a call-up from Kosovo for the 2018–19 UEFA Nations League matches against Malta and Azerbaijan. Eleven days later, he made his debut with Kosovo in a 2018–19 UEFA Nations League match against Azerbaijan after being named in the starting line-up.

Personal life
Muric was born in Schlieren, Switzerland to Albanian parents from Rožaje, Montenegro. He holds Kosovan, Montenegrin and Swiss passports.

Career statistics

Club

International

Honours
Manchester City
FA Cup: 2018–19
EFL Cup: 2018–19

Notes and references

Notes

References

External links

Arijanet Muric at the Football Association of Montenegro

1998 births
Living people
People from Schlieren, Switzerland
Sportspeople from the canton of Zürich
Kosovan footballers
Kosovo international footballers
Kosovan expatriate footballers
Kosovan expatriate sportspeople in England
Kosovan expatriate sportspeople in the Netherlands
Kosovan expatriate sportspeople in Spain
Kosovan expatriate sportspeople in Turkey
Montenegrin footballers
Montenegro under-21 international footballers
Montenegrin people of Kosovan descent
Albanians in Montenegro
Montenegrin expatriate footballers
Montenegrin expatriate sportspeople in England
Montenegrin expatriate sportspeople in the Netherlands
Montenegrin expatriate sportspeople in Spain
Montenegrin expatriate sportspeople in Turkey
Swiss men's footballers
Swiss people of Kosovan descent
Swiss people of Albanian descent
Swiss people of Montenegrin descent
Swiss expatriate footballers
Swiss expatriate sportspeople in England
Swiss expatriate sportspeople in the Netherlands
Swiss expatriate sportspeople in Spain
Swiss expatriate sportspeople in Turkey
Association football goalkeepers
Manchester City F.C. players
Eredivisie players
NAC Breda players
Willem II (football club) players
English Football League players
Nottingham Forest F.C. players
Burnley F.C. players
Segunda División players
Girona FC players
Süper Lig players
Adana Demirspor footballers